The Crime Doctor is a fictional character created by Max Marcin. Criminal Phil Morgan suffers amnesia and becomes criminal psychologist Dr. Ordway. He uses his expertise to solve crimes as well as to help patients.

The character was the hero of the CBS radio program Crime Doctor on Sunday nights between 1940 and 1947. Dr. Benjamin Ordway was played by Ray Collins, House Jameson, Brian Donlevy, Hugh Marlowe, Everett Sloane and John McIntire.

Columbia Pictures Corporation made a series of 10 low-budget "Crime Doctor" mysteries from 1943 through 1949. In them, Dr. Robert Ordway was played exclusively by Warner Baxter. In the first film, as an in-joke, Collins played the supporting role of Dr. John Carey, the Crime Doctor's doctor. Baxter was in poor health much of the time while working on the series, and two years after making the tenth film, he died of pneumonia.

In March 2014, the "Crime Doctor" film series was shown on GetTV, an American digital multicast television network owned by Sony Pictures Entertainment. Sony acquired Columbia Pictures Corporation in 1989.

Radio

Films
Crime Doctor (1943)
The Crime Doctor's Strangest Case (1943)
Shadows in the Night (1944) (aka The Crime Doctor's Rendezvous)
Crime Doctor's Warning (1945)
The Crime Doctor's Courage (1945)
Just Before Dawn (1946) (aka Exposed by the Crime Doctor)
The Crime Doctor's Man Hunt (1946)
The Millerson Case (1947) (aka The Crime Doctor's Vacation)
The Crime Doctor's Gamble (1947)
The Crime Doctor's Diary (1949)

References

External links

MP3 files of radio episodes at archive.org

Radio characters introduced in 1940
Film characters introduced in 1943
Film series introduced in 1943
Male characters in radio
Crime film characters
American film series
Crime film series
Fictional psychiatrists
Fictional amateur detectives